Ólafur Ólafsson (born 28 November 1990) is an Icelandic basketball player for Úrvalsdeild karla club Grindavík, and a member of the Icelandic national team. Known for his high energy, explosiveness and strength, he won back-to-back national championships with Grindavík in 2012 and 2013 and the Icelandic Cup in 2014.

Playing career
Ólafur came up through the junior ranks of Grindavík and played his first senior game during the 2005-2006 Úrvalsdeild karla season. He soon became known for his jumping ability and won the Icelandic All-star game dunk contest in 2008. He spent the 2008-2009 season in Germany with Eisbären Bremerhaven before returning to Grindavík in 2009. He helped Grindavík win the national championship in 2012 and 2013, and the Icelandic Basketball Cup in 2014.

Ólafur joined St. Clement in the French NM2 in 2015 where he averaged 14 points per game. He rejoined Grindavík in June 2016.

Ólafur was named to the Úrvalsdeild Domestic All-First Team in 2017.

He helped Grindavík to the Icelandic Cup Finals in February 2020 where it lost to Stjarnan despite Ólafur's 20 points.

On 2 May 2021, he scored a game winning three pointer at the buzzer from behind the half-court line against KR. On 5 November 2022, he had 9 steals in a victory against Njarðvík.

On 16 December 2022, Ólafur scored 32 points, including career hight 8 three pointers, in a 78-81 victory against Haukar.

National team
Ólafur has been a member of the Icelandic national team since 2011. He was a member of the team that won bronze at the 2017 Games of the Small States of Europe.

Awards, titles and accomplishments

Individual awards
Úrvalsdeild Domestic All-First Team : 2017

Titles
Icelandic champion (2): 2012, 2013
Icelandic Basketball Cup: 2014
Icelandic Supercup (3): 2011, 2012, 2013
Icelandic Company Cup (2): 2009, 2011

Accomplishments
Icelandic All-Star Game dunk contest winner: 2008, 2010

References

External links
Úrvalsdeild profile
Profile at realgm.com

1990 births
Living people
Olafur Olafsson
Forwards (basketball)
Olafur Olafsson
Olafur Olafsson
Olafur Olafsson